Heinrich Otto Seetzen, called Heinz Seetzen (22 June 1906, in Rüstringen, Duchy of Oldenburg – 28 September 1945, in Blankenese), was a German jurist, SS-Standartenführer and police colonel. Seetzen was a perpetrator of the Holocaust, responsible for the mass murder of civilians in Ukraine and in Belarus.

Life
Seetzen was born in 1906 as the only child of a deli owner in Rüstringen, in what is today part of Wilhelmshaven.  While a student he joined the Jungstahlhelm. Seetzen studied jurisprudence at the University of Marburg and the University of Kiel.  After his law examination he worked, helping out in various law firms. Heinz Seetzen was married to Ellen Knickrem.

On 1 May 1933, he joined the NSDAP (Nazi Party membership number 2,732,725) and the SA.  On 1 February 1935, he became a member of the SS (membership number 267,231).  After an unsuccessful bid for the post of mayor in Eutin, the unemployed Seetzen took a job as a temporary worker in the Eutin government, as an assistant to SA-Brigadeführer Heinrich Böhmcker.  In 1935, he joined the Gestapo.

Seetzen was promoted to Chief of the SiPo and SD in Aachen (1935-1938), Vienna, Stettin and Hamburg (January 1940 to July 1941, then absent until August 1942).  As of August 1942, he was Chief of the SiPo and SD in Kassel, and then in spring 1943 in Breslau.  In 1944, he was commander of the SiPo in Prague.

After the invasion of the Soviet Union in 1941, Seetzen was commander of Sonderkommando 10a, which followed Army Group South and was responsible for mass killings in the south of the Soviet Union.  Austrian police officer Robert Barth, an accomplice in the mass murder, said about Seetzen:

"A particularly brutal Kommandoführer [...]. He is said to have boasted that his Kommando would shoot the most Jews.

From 28 April to August 1944, he served as commander of Einsatzgruppe B, which perpetrated mass murder in Belarus.  This unit was responsible for the deaths of more than 134,000 people in Minsk and Smolensk.  After his promotion to SS-Standartenführer and police colonel, he was made Commander of the SiPo and SD in Belarus in April 1944.

Post-war; arrest and suicide
After the war, Seetzen stayed with a female acquaintance, hiding his identity by using the false name "Michael Gollwitzer". His acquaintance reported that Seetzen was remorseful and completely finished from a moral perspective.  He told her "that he was heavily burdened by guilt, that he was a criminal, and that he had essentially forfeited his life." He also openly admitted that he would commit suicide by taking potassium cyanide the moment he was captured.

After his arrest by the British military police in Hamburg-Blankenese on 28 September 1945, Seetzen committed suicide using a cyanide capsule. He was not identified and was buried as "Michael Gollwitzer". Due to this fact (since his whereabouts remained uncertain), a Denazification Court classified Seetzen as a "lesser offender" (Group 3- Minderbelasteten) in 1949, adding the stipulation, "in the event that the person concerned is still alive".

References

Bibliography
 Lawrence D. Stokes: Heinz Seetzen - Chef des Sonderkommandos 10a. In: Klaus-Michael Mallmann, Gerhard Paul (eds.): Karrieren der Gewalt. Nationalsozialistische Täterbiographien Wissenschaftliche Buchgesellschaft, Darmstadt 2004, 
 Lawrence D. Stokes: From law student to Einsatzgruppe commander: The career of a Gestapo officer. Canadian Journal of History, April 2002.
 Linde Apel, Hamburg Ministry of Culture, Sports and Media, in cooperation with the Research Center for Contemporary History in Hamburg and the Neuengamme Concentration Camp Memorial (eds.): In den Tod geschickt - Die Deportationen von Juden, Roma und Sinti aus Hamburg, 1940 bis 1945, Metropol Verlag, Hamburg 2009
 Ernst Klee: Das Personenlexikon zum Dritten Reich. Fischer, Frankfurt am Main 2007. . (revised second edition)

1906 births
1945 suicides
Year of death uncertain
Einsatzgruppen personnel
Jurists from Lower Saxony
Gestapo personnel
Holocaust perpetrators in Belarus
Holocaust perpetrators in Ukraine
Lawyers in the Nazi Party
Nazis who committed suicide in Germany
Suicides by cyanide poisoning
Nazis who committed suicide in prison custody
People from the Duchy of Oldenburg
Sturmabteilung personnel
SS-Standartenführer
Stahlhelm members
University of Kiel alumni
University of Marburg alumni
20th-century German lawyers